The Mustard Grain is a 1962 Spanish comedy film directed and written by José Luis Sáenz de Heredia. It stars Manolo Gómez Bur, Rafael Alonso, Amparo Soler Leal, Gracita Morales and José Bódalo.

Plot 
The storyline features a game of dominoes that results in an argument between Evelio and Horcajo and a challenge that could be deadly as lengths are taken to avoid that outcome over the course of 24 hours.

Cast

Production 
The film is a Tarfe and AS production, and it was scored by Juan Quintero. Shooting locations included Madrid.

Release 
The film premiered at the Madrid's  on 30 August 1962.

Reception
Bernard P. E Bentley deemed the film to be "a showcase for its large cast". Joaquín de Luna considered the film to be a "little-known" instance of hispanic costumbrismo featuring the "refreshing" intervention of Gracita Morales. According to Jordi Batlle Caminal the film belongs to the "insubstantial" subset of films within Sáenz de Heredia's filmography.

It won a film prize.

See also
 List of Spanish films of 1962
 Parable of the Mustard Seed

References

Bibliography 
 Bentley, Bernard. A Companion to Spanish Cinema. Boydell & Brewer 2008.

External links 
 
 Presentation of The Mustard Grain on RTVE Play
 

1962 comedy films
Spanish comedy films
1962 films
1960s Spanish-language films
Films directed by José Luis Sáenz de Heredia
Films scored by Juan Quintero Muñoz
Films shot in Madrid
1960s Spanish films